Tean  railway station was a railway station located on the Cheadle Branch Line at Totmonslow, Staffordshire. It was opened as Totmonslow in 1892 and was the terminus of the line until it reached Cheadle in 1901.

Facilities
The station was located in a cutting underneath the Stoke to Uttoxeter turnpike road and had a small goods siding with shed. Because of the restricted location, a loop was provided a short distance to the south, although it was never actually used a such and was removed in 1938.

A platform shelter was the only building until 1907, when part of the station building from Keele Park railway station was erected, the latter having closed earlier that year. Up until this point, a nearby cottage was used as a booking office.

Later years
The station was renamed in 1906 after the village of Upper Tean, which was located around a mile east of Totmonslow. It was never well used and closed in 1953, having by then been reduced to a halt. The goods siding was soon removed and the station site occupied by a scrap merchant until 1977.

The site today
The track was removed in 2013.  The platform remains, although overgrown, and can be seen from the adjacent road bridge.

References

Further reading

Disused railway stations in Staffordshire
Railway stations in Great Britain closed in 1953
Railway stations in Great Britain opened in 1892
Former North Staffordshire Railway stations